The Sanjak of Kütahya was a second-level province (sanjak) of the Ottoman Empire.

Kütahya was the capital of the Anatolian beylik of Germiyan, and became part of the Ottoman state in 1381 through the marriage of the future Sultan Bayezid I with Devlet Hatun, the daughter of the Germiyanid ruler. Initially known as the Sanjak of Germiyan, it became part of the Anatolia Eyalet from its formation in the late 14th century, and in the late 15th century became the capital of the eyalet until its dissolution ca. 1841, when it became part of Hüdavendigâr Eyalet. In 1912 it comprised the districts (kazas) of Kütahya proper, Eskişehir, Uşak, Kedus and Simav.

References

Sources 
 

Kutahya
States and territories established in 1381
History of Kütahya Province
History of Eskişehir Province
History of Uşak Province
1381 establishments in the Ottoman Empire